Bar is the first local season of the reality The Bar in Poland.

Synopsis
Start Date: 2 March 2002.
End Date: 1 June 2002.
Duration: 92 days.
Contestants:
The Finalists: Adrian (The Winner) & Grzegorz (Runner-up).
Evicted Contestants: Arek, Beata, Emilia, Gosia, Iza, Leszek, Magda, Marian, Mirek, Monika, Natalia, Natasza, Paulina & Roman.

Contestants

Nominations

References

2002 Polish television seasons